José Luis Alvarado Nieves (March 19, 1963 – July 26, 2021) was a Mexican luchador best known under the ring name Brazo de Plata, a name he had used since his debut in 1977. He is also well known for his appearances in WWE as Super Porky. Alvarado was a member of the Alvarado wrestling family which includes his father Shadito Cruz, five brothers who used the "Brazo" name at some point and several third-generation wrestlers who have appeared over the last couple of years.

Professional wrestling career

Early career (1977–1988)
Alvarado made his debut as "Brazo De Plata" (Spanish for "Silver arm"), an Enmascarado (masked wrestler) who worked mainly in tag team matches with his brother who worked as Brazo de Oro ("Gold arm") and in trios action with another brother known simply as El Brazo ("the arm"). Los Brazos, as they were billed, wrestled all over Mexico and made appearances for the Los Angeles based NWA Hollywood Wrestling. While working for NWA Hollywood Wrestling, Plata and Oro won the NWA Americas Tag Team Championship from Chino Chou and the Kiss on November 7, 1981. The brothers were also last holders of the Los Angeles version of the NWA World Tag Team Championship in 1982.

Losing the masks (1988–1990)
Over the years Brazo de Plata and his brothers competed in a large number of Luchas de Apuestas ("Bet fights") where they put their masks or hair on the line against their opponents. Los Brazos' most famous Luchas de Apuestas occurred on October 21, 1988, when Brazo de Plata, Brazo de Oro, and El Brazo all placed their masks on the line in a match against another well known Lucha libre family, Los Villanos, in this case Villano I, Villano IV and Villano V. The match was the culmination of a long feud (storyline) between the two families and saw all six wrestlers bleed profusely during the bout. In the end Los Villanos won the match, forcing all three Brazos to unmask and reveal their real names as is tradition in these types of matches. Despite losing their masks Los Brazos remained successful in the ring, winning various tag team and trios titles, such as the UWA World Tag Team Championship, UWA World Trios Championship, WWA World Tag Team Championship and the WWA World Trios Championship.

Consejo Mundial de Lucha Libre (1985–2005)
Alvarado debuted for Consejo Mundial de Lucha Libre (CMLL) in 1985. By the 1990s Los Brazos worked primarily for CMLL, where Plato, Oro and El Brazo won the CMLL World Trios Championship from Los Infernales (Pirata Morgan, Satánico and MS-1) on April 6, 1993. Los Brazos lost the titles to Dr. Wagner Jr., Gran Markus Jr. and El Hijo del Gladiador. 1993 also saw Brazo de Plata get the biggest singles win of his career as he defeated Black Magic for the CMLL World Heavyweight Championship, a title he would hold over a year.

As the years wore on and Brazo de Plata's waistline expanded he found himself working a more comedic style, often seen as a specialty act. During this time period he was nicknamed "Super Porky" in reference to his weight gain, a nickname Brazo de Plata seemed to embrace.

World Wrestling Entertainment

Juniors division (2005–2006)
Plata was hired by World Wrestling Entertainment (WWE) in 2005 as part of the SmackDown! brand's short-lived Juniors Division. Plata was billed as "Super Porky" and paired up with the minis of the Juniors division. Brazo de Plata's appearances played for comedy and no real in-ring appearances came of it before the entire Juniors division concept was ended in March 2006 and all the workers in the division were released.

Lucha Libre AAA Worldwide (2006–2009)

After having worked for many years for CMLL Brazo de Plata jumped to its rival promotion Lucha Libre AAA Worldwide (AAA) making one of his first appearances at AAA's annual Verano de Escandalo show. Almost from the start Brazo de Plata began working a storyline with "Los Guapos VIP" a stable of wrestlers obsessed with their good looks, the polar opposite of the fun loving, overweight Brazo de Plata. At Verano de Escándalo, Brazo de Plata, Intocable, El Oriental and El Zorro lost to the team of Alan Stone, Hator, Scorpio Jr., and Zumbido. At the following featured show, Guerrera de Titanes 2006, Brazo de Plata had his hair shaved off as he lost a Dog collar chain match to Alan Stone and Scorpio Jr. The storyline with Los Guapos VIP continued throughout 2007 and into 2008 where it saw a surprising turn. Brazo de Plata's brother El Brazo jumped to AAA and attacked his own brother, taking the (storyline) control of the Los Guapos VIP group. The storyline fight of the two brothers came to a crescendo at Guerrera de Titanes 2008, where they faced off in a steel cage match where the loser would have his hair shaved off. El Brazo lost and had his hair shaved to put at least a temporary end to the storyline.

He left AAA in March 2009, with his last appearance being March 15 at the Plaza Nuevo Progreso in Guadalajara, Jalisco, losing to La Parka in a semi-final of the Reyes de Reyes Tournament, also featuring Escoria and Kenzo Suzuki.

Later Career (2009–2016)
After leaving AAA, Plata began working independent dates throughout the country as well as wrestling regularly for the International Wrestling Revolution Group (IWRG), Perros del Mal Producciones (PdM), and his former home promotion CMLL. He wrestled his last match in 2016.

Death
On July 26, 2021, Nieves died at the age of 58; his cause of death was a heart attack. According to his son, wrestler Psycho Clown, his father's girlfriend called him to tell him he was not breathing. Psycho Clown arrived at his father's house and performed CPR, to no success.

Alvarado family

The Alvarado wrestling family spans three generations starting with Shadito Cruz followed by his 6 sons and a third-generation who have begun wrestling in recent years. José Alvarado has 5 children who have all followed in his footsteps, his sons José (working as Máximo), Psycho Clown and Magia Jr. and his two daughters Danah and Gloria Alvarado Nava, who wrestles as Goya Kong.

† = deceased

Championships and accomplishments
Consejo Mundial de Lucha Libre
CMLL World Heavyweight Championship (1 time)
CMLL World Trios Championship (1 time) – with Brazo de Oro and El Brazo
Mexican National Tag Team Championship (1 time) – with Brazo de Oro
Mexican National Trios Championship (3 times) – with Brazo de Oro and El Brazo (2) and El Brazo and Super Elektra (1)
Federación Internacional de Lucha Libre
FILL Trios Championship (1 time) – with Brazo de Oro and El Brazo
NWA Hollywood Wrestling
NWA Americas Tag Team Championship (1 time) – with Brazo de Oro
NWA World Tag Team Championship (Los Angeles version) (1 time) – with Brazo de Oro
Pro Wrestling Illustrated
PWI ranked him #229 of the 500 best singles wrestlers of the PWI 500 in 2006
Universal Wrestling Association
UWA World Tag Team Championship (1 time) – with Brazo de Oro
UWA World Trios Championship (3 times) – with Brazo de Oro and El Brazo
World Wrestling Association
WWA World Tag Team Championship (1 time) – with Brazo de Oro
WWA World Trios Championship (1 time)
Wrestling Observer Newsletter
Wrestling Observer Newsletter Hall of Fame (Class of 2021) as part of Los Brazos
Other titles
Distrito Federal Trios Championship (1 time) – with Brazo de Oro and El Brazo
Distrito Federal Tag Team Championship (1 time) – with El Brazo
Puebla Tag Team Championship (1 time) – with Brazo de Oro

Luchas de Apuestas record

Mixed martial arts record

|-
| Loss
| align=center| 0–1
| Takumi Yano
| Submission (heel hook)
| Deep - 9th Impact
| 
| align=center| 2
| align=center| 0:24
| Tokyo, Japan
|

Notes

References

General

Specific

1963 births
2021 deaths
20th-century professional wrestlers
21st-century professional wrestlers
Alvarado wrestling family
Mexican male professional wrestlers
Professional wrestlers from Mexico City
Mexican National Trios Champions
CMLL World Heavyweight Champions
CMLL World Trios Champions
UWA World Trios Champions
UWA World Tag Team Champions
NWA Americas Tag Team Champions